Naseeb Abdul Juma Issack (born 2 October 1989), popularly known by his stage name Diamond Platnumz, is a Tanzanian bongo flava recording artist, dancer, philanthropist and businessman. He is the founder and CEO of WCB Wasafi Record Label, Wasafi Bet and Wasafi Media. Diamond has gained a massive following in East and Central Africa. He became the first Africa-based artist to reach a combined total of one billion views on YouTube.

After signing a record deal with Universal Music in 2017, Platnumz released his third studio album, A Boy from Tandale (2018).
In 2021, Diamond together with his record label WCB Wasafi entered into a 360 Partnership with Warner Music Group.

Career 
He started his music career in 2006 at the age of 17 years old while selling clothes. He would record songs with the money he earned from the clothes' business and eventually recorded his first single "Toka Mwanzo", a Bongo flava song fused with R&B. The song was not successful commercially.

His breakthrough hit single "Kamwambie" was released in 2010. The song won three Tanzania Music Awards. He then released his debut studio album Kamwambie same year in 2010.

In 2014, Platnumz earned nomination at BET Awards 2014 for Best International Act: Africa.

Platnumz has frequently collaborated with videographer Director Kenny for his music videos. The music video for "Waah", directed by Kenny, was nominated for "Best African Video" at the 2021 All Africa Music Awards.
In 2022, he released his 10 tracks extended playlist known as First Of All (FOA) where he featured top artists like Zuchu, Adekunle Gold, Focalistic and many other top African artists.

First Of All has been described as a blend of R&B, Bongo Flava and Afrobeats  and to promote the EP, Diamond Platnumz for the first time in Tanzania premiered all music videos from the FOA EP at the cinema

Personal life 
Diamond is a Muslim by religion. With his former partner, South African-based Ugandan businesswoman Zari Hassan, he has two children. He became a father for the third time with Tanzanian model Hamisa Mobetto. As of 2019 Diamond was dating Kenyan model and musician Tanasha Donna, with whom he fathered one son, born in October 2019. The two have since separated with Tanasha Donna flying back to her home country, Kenya.  

Diamond is the cousin of Tanzanian socialite-cum-DJ, Romeo Abdul Jones, professionally known as Romy Jones. He also has two sisters, musician Queen Darleen, and entrepreneur-socialite Esma Platnumz.

In 2010, he endorsed Tanzania's dominant ruling party, the Chama Cha Mapinduzi (CCM) and its presidential candidate, Jakaya Mrisho Kikwete. He has released further songs with lyrics supporting CCM, such as "CCM Tusonge Mbele" ("CCM Let's Move Forward").

In the 2022 Kenyan general election Diamond Platnumz endorsed and performed at the Raila Odinga campaign rally at Kasarani held on 6 August 2022 just 3 days before the election

Commercial activities
On 23 January 2019, Diamond Platnumz was officially introduced as Pepsi Brand Ambassador in East Africa.

On 13 September 2019, Diamond Platnumz became Brand Ambassador of Parimatch Africa.

On 25 September 2019, Diamond was named the Nice One Brand Ambassador.

On 4 March 2020, Diamond Platnumz was unveiled as the new Brand Ambassador of Coral Paints (Tanzania).

On 11 December 2021 he launched Wasafibet in partnership with Odibets-a Kenyan Sports betting company.

Awards and nominations 

He is the most decorated music artist in East and Central Africa .

Discography

Albums

2010: Kamwambie
2012: Lala Salama
2018: A Boy from Tandale
2022: First Of All

Singles and collaborations

Featured in
"Watora Mari" (Jah Prayzah ft. Diamond Platnumz)

References

External links 

 
 
 

1989 births
Living people
21st-century Tanzanian male singers
People from Dar es Salaam
Tanzanian Muslims
 Swahili-language singers
 Tanzanian Bongo Flava musicians